Partial least squares regression (PLS regression) is a statistical method that bears some relation to principal components regression; instead of finding hyperplanes of maximum variance between the response and independent variables, it finds a linear regression model by projecting the predicted variables and the observable variables to a new space. Because both the X and Y data are projected to new spaces, the PLS family of methods are known as bilinear factor models. Partial least squares discriminant analysis (PLS-DA) is a variant used when the Y is categorical.

PLS is used to find the fundamental relations between two matrices (X and Y), i.e. a latent variable approach to modeling the covariance structures in these two spaces. A PLS model will try to find the multidimensional direction in the X space that explains the maximum multidimensional variance direction in the Y space. PLS regression is particularly suited when the matrix of predictors has more variables than observations, and when there is multicollinearity among X values. By contrast, standard regression will fail in these cases (unless it is regularized).

Partial least squares was introduced by the Swedish statistician Herman O. A. Wold, who then developed it with his son, Svante Wold. An alternative term for PLS is projection to latent structures, but the term partial least squares is still dominant in many areas. Although the original applications were in the social sciences, PLS regression is today most widely used in chemometrics and related areas.  It is also used in bioinformatics, sensometrics, neuroscience, and anthropology.

Underlying model

The general underlying model of multivariate PLS is

Algorithms

Some PLS algorithms are only appropriate for the case where  is a column vector, while others deal with the general case of a matrix . Algorithms also differ on whether they estimate the factor matrix  as an orthogonal (that is, orthonormal) matrix or not. 
The final prediction will be the same for all these varieties of PLS, but the components will differ.

PLS is composed of iteratively repeating the following steps k times (for k components):
 finding the directions of maximal covariance in input and output space
 performing least squares regression on the input score
 deflating the input  and/or target

PLS1

PLS1 is a widely used algorithm appropriate for the vector  case. It estimates  as an orthonormal matrix.
(Caution: the  vectors in the code below may not be normalized appropriately; see talk.)
In pseudocode it is expressed below (capital letters are matrices, lower case letters are vectors if they are superscripted and scalars if they are subscripted).

  1 
  2     
  4     
  5         
  6         
  7         
  8         
  9         
 10         
 11             
 12         
 13             
 14             
 15     
 16     define  to be the matrix 
        Do the same to form the  matrix and  vector.
 17     
 18     
 19     

This algorithm features 'deflation' of the matrix  (subtraction of ), but deflation of the vector  is not performed, as it is not necessary (it can be proved that deflating  yields the same results as not deflating).

Extensions

OPLS 
In 2002 a new method was published called orthogonal projections to latent structures (OPLS). In OPLS, continuous variable data is separated into predictive and uncorrelated (orthogonal) information.  This leads to improved diagnostics, as well as more easily interpreted visualization. However, these changes only improve the interpretability, not the predictivity, of the PLS models.  Similarly, OPLS-DA (Discriminant Analysis) may be applied when working with discrete variables, as in classification and biomarker studies.

The general underlying model of OPLS is

or in O2-PLS

L-PLS 
Another extension of PLS regression, named L-PLS for its L-shaped matrices, connects 3 related data blocks to improve predictability.  In brief, a new Z matrix, with the same amount of columns as the X matrix, is added to the PLS regression analysis and may be suitable for including additional background information on the interdependence of the predictor variables.

3PRF
In 2015 partial least squares was related to a procedure called the three-pass regression filter (3PRF). Supposing the number of observations and variables are large, the 3PRF (and hence PLS) is asymptotically normal for the "best" forecast implied by a linear latent factor model. In stock market data, PLS has been shown to provide accurate out-of-sample forecasts of returns and cash-flow growth.

Partial Least Square SVD 
A PLS version based on singular value decomposition (SVD) provides a memory efficient implementation that can be used to address high-dimensional problems, such as relating millions of genetic markers to thousands of imaging features in imaging genetics, on consumer-grade hardware.

PLS correlation 

PLS correlation (PLSC) is another methodology related to PLS regression, which has been used in neuroimaging   and sport science, to quantify the strength of the relationship between data sets. Typically, PLSC divides the data into two blocks (sub-groups) each containing one or more variables, and then uses singular value decomposition (SVD) to establish the strength of any relationship (i.e. the amount of shared information) that might exist between the two component sub-groups. It does this by using SVD to determine the inertia (i.e. the sum of the singular values) of the covariance matrix of the sub-groups under consideration.

See also
Canonical correlation
Data mining
Deming regression
Feature extraction
Machine learning
Partial least squares path modeling
Principal component analysis
Regression analysis
Total sum of squares

Literature

Weblinks 

 A short introduction to PLS regression and its history
 Video: Derivation of PLS by Prof. H. Harry Asada

References

Latent variable models
Least squares
Articles with example pseudocode